Dirck van Os (Antwerp 13 March 1556 – Amsterdam 20 May 1615) was an Amsterdam merchant, insurer, financier and shipowner. He is among the founders of the Compagnie van Verre, the Amsterdam Exchange Bank and the United East India Company (VOC).

Biography

Van Os was born in Antwerp to a weaver originally from 's-Hertogenbosch, who had moved to Antwerp and labored in glassworks.

He served as captain of militia in the Fall of Antwerp, wherein the city surrendered to the Duke of Parma.  After this point he moved to Middelburg.  In January 1588, Van Os married Margretha van de Piet.  He and his brother Hendrick sailed to obtain leather, grain and precious stones, primarily in the Levant and cities on the Baltic Sea. In 1595, he left on an expedition with Isaac le Maire to get salt in Setúbal.  Van Os acquired more than one-seventh of the land in Beemster.

In 1602 he was one of the founders of the Dutch East India Company, and served as one of the first directors. With 47,000 guilders, he was one of the largest investors. This number grew to 120,000 by 1609. The oldest stock share in the world, dated 27 September 1606, was also signed by him. Van Os was involved in the expedition of Henry Hudson to find an alternative route to the East.

His portrait hangs in the Stedelijk Museum Alkmaar.

Family

His son, Dirck van Os III (1590–1668), served from 1618–1666 as the dijkgraaf of Beemster, and was the subject of a Rembrandt portrait currently owned by Joslyn Art Museum in Omaha, Nebraska.

References

External links 
 

16th-century Dutch businesspeople
17th-century Dutch businesspeople
1556 births
1615 deaths
Businesspeople from Amsterdam
Founders of the Dutch East India Company
Military personnel from Antwerp